This article serves as an index – as complete as possible – of all the honorific orders or similar decorations awarded by Johor, classified by Monarchies chapter and Republics chapter, and, under each chapter, recipients' countries and the detailed list of recipients.

Awards

Monarchies

Johor Royal Family 
They have been awarded : 
 Sultan Ibrahim Ismail of Johor :
  Grand Master and First Class (DK I) of the Royal Family Order of Johor 
  Grand Master and First Class (SPMJ) of the Order of the Crown of Johor  with title Dato'''
  Grand Master and Knight Grand Commander of the Order of the Loyalty of Sultan Ismail (1960, SSIJ) with title Dato 
  Sultan Ibrahim Coronation Medal (PSI 1st class) 
  Sultan Mahmud Iskandar Coronation Medal 
 Permaisuri Raja Zarith Sofiah :
  First Class (DK I) of the Royal Family Order of Johor 
  First Class of the Order of the Crown of Johor (SPMJ) with title Dato Tunku Ismail Idris, Crown Prince of Johor : 
  Second Class (DK II, 8.4.2006), now First Class (DK I, 11.4.2009) of the Royal Family Order of Johor
  Companion (SMJ, 8.4.2004), now Knight Grand Commander (SPMJ, 8.4.2005) of the Order of the Crown of Johor with title Dato  Sultan Ibrahim Coronation Medal (PSI 1st class) 
  Sultan Mahmud Iskandar Coronation Medal 
 Tunku Aminah, only daughter of Sultan Ibrahim Ismail of Johor
  First Class of the Royal Family Order of Johor (DK I, 22 November 2012) 
  Grand Commander of the Order of the Crown of Johor (DPMJ, 11 April 2009) with title Dato'''
 Tunku Idris, second son of Ibrahim Ismail of Johor
  First Class of the Royal Family Order of Johor (DK I, 22 November 2012) 
  Knight Grand Commander of the Order of the Crown of Johor (SPMJ) with title Dato
  Sultan Ibrahim Coronation Medal (PSI 1st class) 
  Sultan Mahmud Iskandar Coronation Medal 
 Tunku ‘Abdu’l Jalil, third son of Ibrahim Ismail of Johor
  First Class of the Royal Family Order of Johor (DK I, 22 November 2012) 
  Grand Commander of the Order of the Crown of Johor (DPMJ, 11 April 2009) with title Dato
  Sultan Ibrahim Coronation Medal (PSI 1st class) 
  Sultan Mahmud Iskandar Coronation Medal 
 Tunku ‘Abdu’l Rahman, fourth son of Ibrahim Ismail of Johor
  First Class of the Royal Family Order of Johor (DK I, 22 November 2012) 
  Grand Commander of the Order of the Crown of Johor (DPMJ, 11 April 2009) with title Dato
 Tunku ‘Abu Bakar, fifth son of Ibrahim Ismail of Johor
  First Class of the Royal Family Order of Johor (DK I, 22 November 2012) 

States of Malaysia

Kelantan Royal Family 
They have been awarded: 
 Muhammad V of Kelantan, Sultan of Kelantan (since 13 September 2010) :
  First Class of the Royal Family Order of Johor (DK I, 14 April 2011)
 Ismail Petra of Kelantan, Sultan Muhammad V of Kelantan's father and retired Sultan for illness :
  First Class of the Royal Family Order of Johor (DK I)
 Raja Perampuan Anis, Sultan Muhammad V of Kelantan's mother :
  First Class of the Royal Family Order of Johor (DK I)

Negeri Sembilan Royal Family 
They have been awarded :  
 Muhriz of Negeri Sembilan, Yang di-Pertuan Besar : 
  First Class of the Royal Family Order of Johor (DK I)

Pahang Royal Family 
They have been awarded : 
 Ahmad Shah of Pahang : 
  First Class of the Royal Family Order of Johor (DK I)
  Knight Grand Commander of the Order of the Crown of Johor (SPMJ)
 Sultan Ismail of Johore Coron Medal (1960)
 Abdullah of Pahang, brother-in-law of Sultan Ibrahim Ismail of Johor:
  First Class of the Royal Family Order of Johor (DK I)
  Knight Grand Commander of the Order of the Crown of Johor (SPMJ)
 Tunku Azizah Aminah Maimunah Iskandariah, sister of Sultan Ibrahim Ismail of Johor :
  First Class of the Royal Family Order of Johor (DK I)
  Knight Grand Commander of the Order of the Crown of Johor (SPMJ)

Perak Royal Family 
They have been awarded :  
 Nazrin Shah of Perak : 
  First Class of the Royal Family Order of Johor (DK I)
 Raja Iskandar Dzulkarnain, brother of Permaisuri Raja Zarith Sofiah
  Second Class of the Royal Family Order of Johor (DK II)

Perlis Royal Family 
They have been awarded : 
 Tuanku Sirajuddin of Perlis :
  Knight Grand Commander of the Order of the Crown of Johor (SPMJ)
 Tuanku Fauziah (Tuanku Sirajuddin of Perlis's wife) :
  Knight Grand Commander of the Order of the Crown of Johor (SPMJ, before 1967)

Selangor Royal Family 
They have been awarded : 
 Sharafuddin of Selangor :
  First Class of the Royal Family Order of Johor (DK I)
  Knight Grand Commander of the Order of the Crown of Johor (SPMJ, 1975). 
 Tengku Sulaiman Shah, eldest younger brother of Sultan Sharafuddin :
  First Class of the Royal Family Order of Johor (DK I)
  Knight Grand Commander of the Order of the Crown of Johor (SPMJ)
  Sultan Ibrahim Coronation Medal (PIS)

Terengganu Royal Family 
They have been awarded: 
 Sultan Mizan Zainal Abidin of Terengganu (Sultan : since 15 May 1998 - Y.d-P.A. 12/2006-12/2011)  :
  First Class of the Royal Family Order of Johor (DK I, 8 April 1986)
  Knight Grand Commander of the Order of the Crown of Johor (SPMJ, 8 April 1986)

 Asian monarchies

Brunei Royal Family 

They have been awarded : 
 Hassanal Bolkiah : 
  First Class of the Royal Family Order of Johor (DK I, 1980)
 Mariam, his second wife : 
  First Class of the Royal Family Order of Johor (DK I, 6 March 1997)
  Knight Grand Commander of the Order of the Crown of Johor (SPMJ, 11 April 1987)
 Mohamed Bolkiah, sultan's brother : 
  Knight Grand Commander of the Order of the Crown of Johor (SPMJ)

 European monarchies
to be completed

Republics 
to be completed

See also 
 List of honours of the Johor Royal Family by country

References 

 
Johor